Lost & Found is a 1999 American romantic comedy film directed by Jeff Pollack, written by J. B. Cook, Marc Meeks, and David Spade, and starring Spade, Sophie Marceau, Patrick Bruel, Artie Lange, Mitchell Whitfield, and Martin Sheen.

Plot

Restaurant owner Dylan Ramsey is head-over-heels in love with his new neighbor, a French cellist named Lila. In a desperate attempt to garner her affections, he kidnaps her beloved pet dog and offers to help her find him on a phantom dog hunt. A wrench is thrown in his plans, however, when the dog swallows his best friend's diamond ring, and things get worse for Dylan as Lila's ex-fiancée, Rene, arrives to win her back.

Cast
 David Spade as Dylan Ramsey
 Sophie Marceau as Lila Dubois
 Patrick Bruel as Rene
 Artie Lange as Wally Slack
 Mitchell Whitfield as Mark Gildewell
 Martin Sheen as Millstone
 Christian Clemenson as Ray
 Estelle Harris as Mrs. Stubblefield
 Marla Gibbs as Enid
 Rose Marie as Clara
 Carole Cook as Sylvia
 Michelle Clunie as Gail	
 Ever Carradine as Ginger
 Carl Michael Lindner as Brat
 Jon Lovitz as Uncle Harry Briggs
 Frankie Pace as Sal
 Hal Sparks as DJ
 Jason Stuart as Jewelry Store Clerk
 Frankie Muniz as Boy in TV Movie
 Agata Gotova as Party Guest (uncredited)

Reception

Box office
The film grossed $6,552,255 in the US against a budget of $30 million.

Critical response
On Rotten Tomatoes the film has an approval rating of 13% based on reviews from 52 critics. The site's consensus states: "Aside from a few laughs, everything else is entirely predictable, including the jokes." On Metacritic it has a score of 19% based on reviews from 21 critics, indicating "generally unfavorable reviews". Audiences surveyed by CinemaScore gave the film a grade B− on scale of A to F.

Roger Ebert gave it 1 out of 4 and said it had only one funny scene, Jon Lovitz as a dog whisperer.
Stephen Holden calling it "a rancid little nothing of a movie" in The New York Times.

References

External links

 

1999 films
1999 romantic comedy films
Alcon Entertainment films
American romantic comedy films
Warner Bros. films
Films scored by John Debney
Films with screenplays by David Spade
1990s English-language films
Films directed by Jeff Pollack
1990s American films